Alfred Ethelbert Moss (30 May 1896 – 23 April 1972)  was an English dentist and racing driver.

Born in Kensington, London, Moss was the son of Sarah Jane and Abraham Moses Moss. His father was Jewish, while his mother was a Christian. 
 
Moss became a successful London dentist, and from his mid-twenties he was also an enthusiastic competition driver, beginning his racing career at the Essex Motor Club's Winter Trial in 1921 driving a 1000 cc AV cyclecar. He was disqualified for seeking help after his rear tyres had burst twice. His AV later caught fire in Park Lane, and Moss then acquired a GN cyclecar, with which he enjoyed success in trials and hillclimbs, and which he raced at Brooklands. In 1922, he bought and began to race a Crouch Le Mans sports car which had no front brakes. In the 1924 Indianapolis 500, he placed 14th or 16th (sources differ) in a Fronty Ford.

Moss met his future wife, Aileen Craufurd, at Brooklands. She had been an ambulance driver in the First World War, and also did some racing. They were married at St Marylebone in 1928 and were the parents of the Formula One driver Stirling Moss and the rallying champion Pat Moss.

In 1957 Moss and his son's manager Ken Gregory established the Formula One team British Racing Partnership with the objective to run cars for Stirling, when not under contract with other firms, along with other up-and-coming drivers.

Moss died aged 75 in Stoke Mandeville, Aylesbury, Buckinghamshire, on the 10th anniversary of his son being seriously injured in a car racing crash at Goodwood.

Indianapolis 500 results

References

1896 births
1972 deaths
English people of Jewish descent
English racing drivers
Indianapolis 500 drivers
English dentists
Formula One team owners
20th-century dentists